Fantaisie for piano and orchestra may refer to:
 Fantaisie for piano and orchestra (Debussy)
 Fantaisie for piano and orchestra (Fauré)